Gaius Livius Drusus may refer to:
 Gaius Livius Drusus (consul), Roman consul in 147 BC
 Gaius Livius Drusus (jurist), blind jurist
 Gaius Livius Drusus, presumed brother of empress Livia